Aripra is a village in India located between the villages of Mankada and Tirurkkad, in Malappuram district, Kerala. National Highway No.966 pass through the center of this village.

Transportation
Aripra village connects to other parts of India through Perinthalmanna town. National Highway No.966 goes to Palakkad and Calicut. The nearest airport is at Kozhikode.  The nearest major railway station is at Angadippuram.

References

Villages in Malappuram district
Perinthalmanna area